This is a list of films which placed number one at the weekend box office for the year 2016 in Spain.
{| class="wikitable sortable"
|-
! style="width:1%;"| #
! style="width:10%;"| Date
! style="width:28%;"| Film
! style="width:8%;"| Gross in euros
! style="width:8%;"| Gross in US dollars
! style="width:40%;"| Notes
|-
| 1 ||  || Star Wars: The Force Awakens || €3,256,017 || $3,539,572 || It was Star Wars: The Force Awakens''' third week at number one.
|-
| 2 ||  || Palmeras en la nieve || €1,924,525 || $2,191,368 || Palmeras en la nieve reached the number-one spot in its third weekend of release. It was the first Spanish film to reach number one in 2016.
|-
| 3 ||  || The Hateful Eight || €1,808,119 || $2,056,737 ||
|-
| 4 ||  || Alvin and the Chipmunks: The Road Chip || €1,179,972 || $1,274,364 || Alvin and the Chipmunks: The Road Chip had the lowest number-one weekend debut of 2016.
|-
| 5 ||  || Creed || €1,506,848 || $1,632,378 ||
|-
| 6 ||  || The Revenant || €3,700,349 || $4,096,572 || 
|-
| 7 ||  || Zootopia || €2,765,013 || $3,113,087 ||
|-
| 8 ||  || Deadpool || €3,514,862 || $3,913,185 ||
|-
| 9 ||  || Deadpool || €1,872,906 || $2,048,347 ||
|-
| 10 ||  || Cien años de perdón || €1,587,224 || $1,747,601 || Cien años de perdón was the second Spanish film to reach number one in 2016.
|-
| 11 ||  || The Divergent Series: Allegiant || €1,477,070 || $1,647,247 || 
|-
| 12 ||  || Kung Fu Panda 3 || €1,122,770 || $1,265,692 || Kung Fu Panda 3 reached the number-one spot in its second weekend of release.
|-
| 13 ||  || Batman v Superman: Dawn of Justice || €2,848,614 || $3,182,560 || 
|-
| 14 ||  || Batman v Superman: Dawn of Justice  || €1,298,866 || $1,480,274 || 
|-
| 15 ||  || The Huntsman: Winter's War || €1,245,499 || $1,418,767 || 
|-
| 16 ||  || The Jungle Book || €3,879,566 || $4,379,435  || 
|-
| 17 ||  || The Jungle Book  || €2,798,835 || $3,142,957 || 
|-
| 18 ||  || Captain America: Civil War || €3,714,416 || $4,254,431 ||
|-
| 19 ||  || Captain America: Civil War  || €1,666,136 || $1,900,398 ||
|-
| 20 ||  || The Angry Birds Movie || €1,717,599 || $1,943,139 ||
|-
| 21 ||  || X-Men: Apocalypse || €1,662,315 || $1,866,155 ||
|-
| 22 ||  || Alice Through the Looking Glass || €1,248,177 || $1,387,557 ||
|-
| 23 ||  || Warcraft || €2,222,931 || $2,527,120 ||
|-
| 24 ||  || Warcraft  || €850,324 || $956,915 ||
|-
| 25 ||  || The Conjuring 2 || €1,547,142 || $1,745,245 ||
|-
| 26 ||  || Finding Dory || €2,895,425 || $3,219,321 ||
|-
| 27 ||  || Finding Dory  || €1,877,794 || $2,093,439 ||
|-
| 28 ||  || Finding Dory  || €1,199,241 || $1,325,729 ||
|-
| 29 ||  || Ice Age: Collision Course || €1,339,238 || $1,478,563 ||
|-
| 30 ||  || The Legend of Tarzan || €1,648,376 || $1,810,149 ||
|-
| 31 ||  || Jason Bourne || €1,665,162 || $1,861,577 ||
|-
| 32 ||  || The Secret Life of Pets || €4,084,221 || $4,529,920 || 
|-
| 33 ||  || The Secret Life of Pets  || €1,902,021 || $2,124,000 ||
|-
| 34 ||  || The Secret Life of Pets  || €1,379,160 || $1,562,610 ||
|-
| 35 ||  || Cuerpo de élite || €1,266,503 || $1,418,654 || Cuerpo de élite was the third Spanish film to reach number one in 2016.
|-
| 36 ||  || Ben-Hur || €1,006,062 || $1,121,539 ||
|-
| 37 ||  || Cuerpo de élite  || €653,994 || $726,160 || Cuerpo de élite reclaimed the number-one spot in its third weekend of release. The third weekend of Cuerpo de élite had the lowest number-one weekend of 2016.
|-
| 38 ||  || Bridget Jones's Baby || €1,440,270 || $1,561,573 ||
|-
| 39 ||  || The Magnificent Seven || €1,035,693 || $1,159,349 ||
|-
| 40 ||  || Miss Peregrine's Home for Peculiar Children || €1,804,361 || $2,032,291 ||
|-
| 41 ||  || A Monster Calls || €3,224,899 || $3,611,714 || A Monster Calls was the fourth Spanish film to reach number one in 2016.
|-
| 42 ||  || A Monster Calls  || €3,667,456 || $4,024,422 ||
|-
| 43 ||  || A Monster Calls  || €2,809,879 || $3,059,637 ||
|-
| 44 ||  || Doctor Strange || €1,938,843 || $2,130,129 ||
|-
| 45 ||  || Trolls || €1,735,350 || $1,933,322 || Trolls reached the number-one spot in its second weekend of release.
|-
| 46 ||  || Trolls  || €1,334,907 || $1,449,253 ||
|-
| 47 ||  || Fantastic Beasts and Where to Find Them || €4,159,319 || $4,404,192 ||
|-
| 48 ||  || Fantastic Beasts and Where to Find Them  || €2,282,674 || $2,418,087 ||
|-
| 49 ||  || Moana || €1,793,947 || $1,913,543 ||
|-
| 50 ||  || Moana  || €1,361,673 || $1,438,032 ||
|-
| 51 ||  || Rogue One: A Star Wars Story || €4,523,952 || $4,728,211 || Rogue One: A Star Wars Story had the highest number-one weekend of 2016.
|-
| 52 ||  || Sing || €1,965,654 || $2,055,264 ||
|-
| 53 ||  || Sing  || €2,343,516 || $2,465,302 ||
|}

Highest-grossing filmsAs of 7 April 2017''

See also
 List of Spanish films — Spanish films by year

References

2016

Spain